List of fellows of the American Academy in Rome is a list of those who have been awarded the Rome Prize.

The  Rome Prize is a prestigious American award made annually by the American Academy in Rome, through a national competition, to 15 emerging artists (working in Architecture, Landscape architecture, Design, Historic Preservation and Conservation, Literature, Musical composition, or Visual arts) and to 15 scholars (working in Ancient, Medieval, Renaissance and early Modern, or Modern Italian Studies).

Fellows of the American Academy in Rome

1971

1972

1973

1974

1975

1976

1977

1978

1979

1980

1981

1982

1983

1984

1985

1986

1987

1988

1989

1990

References

External links
 American Academy in Rome, official website of the Academy
 American Academy in Rome

American awards
Arts awards
Architecture awards
American music awards
History awards
Education in Rome
Culture in Rome
Awards established in 1896
American Academy of Rome
Fellows of the American Academy in Rome 1971 - 1990
20th-century awards
1971